Miranda Bonansea (31 October 1926 – 10 February 2019) was an Italian actress and voice actress.

Life 
Born in Mondovì, Bonansea's father, Piero Bonansea was a photographer for the House of Savoy. At a young age, Bonansea moved to Rome with her family where she would become a child actress as well as a voice dubber. In 1934, she made her debut appearance in the film The Blind Woman of Sorrento. She was also the official Italian voice of Shirley Temple. In the 1937 film Hands Off Me! starring Totò, Bonansea made her character very similar to Temple's likeness.

Other than Shirley Temple, Bonansea has dubbed other actresses such as Judy Garland, Anne Francis, Linda Hunt, June Allyson, Jean Simmons, Jane Powell, Betty White and Marilyn Monroe. She also done some acting work on stage and the radio but she focused entirely on dubbing as an adult. In 2009, Bonansea retired from voice acting effectively ending her 77 year long career.

Personal life
Bonansea was married to singer Claudio Villa from 1952 to 1962. Together, they had one son, Mauro.

Death
Bonansea died on 10 February 2019 at the age of 92. She suffered an illness for quite some time.

Filmography

Cinema
The Blind Woman of Sorrento (1934)
Red Passport (1935)
The Joker King (1935)
The Great Silence (1936)
The Three Wishes (1937)
Hands Off Me! (1937)
Il torrente (1938)
 The Dream of Butterfly (1939)
I sette peccati (1942)

Dubbing roles

Animation
Little Sister in Robin Hood
Faline in Bambi
Nanny in 101 Dalmatians II: Patch's London Adventure
Slurm Queen in Futurama

Live action
Elizabeth Blair in Curly Top
Sara Crewe in The Little Princess
Shirley Blake in Bright Eyes
Heidi in Heidi
Lloyd Sherman in The Little Colonel
Virgie Cary in The Littlest Rebel
Dimples Appleby in Dimples
Molly Middleton in Our Little Girl
Barbary Barry in Poor Little Rich Girl
Barbara "Ching-Ching" Stewart in Stowaway
Penelope "Penny" Day in Now and Forever
Helen "Star" Mason in Captain January
Shirley in Change of Heart
Betsy Brown in Little Miss Broadway
Mytyl in The Blue Bird
Barbara Marshall in I'll Be Seeing You
Barbara Olmstead in Honeymoon
Bridget Hilton in Since You Went Away
Dinah Sheldon in Adventure in Baltimore
Philadelphia Thursday in Fort Apache
Mary Hagen in That Hagen Girl
Ellen Baker in Mr. Belvedere Goes to College
Susan Turner in The Bachelor and the Bobby-Soxer
Dorothy Gale in The Wizard of Oz
Jane Falbury in Summer Stock
Hannah Brown in Easter Parade
Roberta Stevens in Love Nest
Amy Fowler Kane in High Noon
Jacqueline "Jake" Osborne in Elopement
Mama Kowolski in Bruce Almighty
Sarah Beckett in Philadelphia
Martha Wilson in Dennis the Menace
Miss Schlowski in Kindergarten Cop
Grandma Estelle in Stuart Little
Judge McGruder in Judge Dredd
Sister Madeline in Dragonfly
Ann Douglas in The Bold and the Beautiful

References

External links

 
 

1926 births
2019 deaths
People from Mondovì
Italian voice actresses
Italian radio actresses
Italian film actresses
Italian child actresses
Italian stage actresses
20th-century Italian actresses